Ernest Lluch Martín, (21 January 1937 – 21 November 2000) was a Spanish economist and politician, member of the Socialists' Party of Catalonia (PSC). He was Minister of Health and Consumption from 1982 to 1986 in the first Spanish Socialist Workers' Party (PSOE) government of Felipe González. He was assassinated in 2000 by the Basque separatist organisation, ETA.

Background
Lluch was born in Vilassar de Mar, Barcelona province. He earned a PhD in Economic Sciences at the University of Barcelona (UB), and studied further at the Sorbonne in Paris. While he was a lecturer at the UB, he was arrested on several occasions and expelled from the university because of his anti-francoist political activity. From this position, he published seminal works on Spanish political economy. He held the Chair of Economics at the University of Valencia (1974) and the Chair of History of Economic Doctrines at the UB. His last official position was as Director of the Menéndez Pelayo International University in Santander, from 1989 to 1995.

Later career and death
In April 1980 he was chosen as spokesman of the Socialists' Party of Catalonia (PSC) to the Congress of Deputies, and, two years later, in the 1982 general election, he was elected member of the Lower House in representation of Barcelona. Felipe González appointed him as Minister of Health and Consumption in his first government. He held the post until 1986.

In May 1986 he retired from politics to resume the chair of History of Economic Doctrines of the University of Barcelona. On 2 January 1989 he took up his position as Director of the Menéndez Pelayo International University in Santander.

He was assassinated by ETA, who shot him twice in the head at his home in Barcelona, in 2000. The crime was claimed by the ETA's so-called  Comando Barcelona, formed by Fernando García Jodrá, alias 'Txomin', Liarni Artmendaritz and José Antonio Krutxaga. In 2002, the three members of the Commando were arrested and sentenced by the Spanish National High Court to 33 years in prison for the murder.

Bibliography 
 El pensament econòmic a Catalunya (1760-1849). Edicions 62, 1973. 
 La via valenciana. Editorial Tres i Quatre, 1976 (Premi Joan Fuster d'assaig, 1975) 
 La Catalunya vençuda del segle XVIII. Foscors i clarors de la Il·lustració. Edicions 62, 1996. 
 Las Españas vencidas del siglo XVIII. Editorial Crítica, 1999. 
 L'alternativa catalana (1700-1714-1740). Ramon de Vilana i Perlas i Juan Amor de Soria: teoria i acció austriacistes. Eumo Editorial, 2000. 
 La passió per la música. Recerques d'un melòman il.lustrat. CCG Edicions, 2004.

See also
Ernest Lluch (Barcelona Metro) - a station on Barcelona Metro line L5.

References

External links
Special Collection: Ernest Lluch (University of Barcelona Library)

1937 births
2000 deaths
20th-century Spanish  economists
Assassinated Spanish politicians
Economists from Catalonia
Politicians from Catalonia
Deaths by firearm in Spain
Male murder victims
Members of the 1st Congress of Deputies (Spain)
Members of the 2nd Congress of Deputies (Spain)
Members of the 4th Congress of Deputies (Spain)
Members of the constituent Congress of Deputies (Spain)
People from Vilassar de Mar
People killed by ETA (separatist group)
People murdered in Spain
Spanish Socialist Workers' Party politicians
Spanish terrorism victims
University of Barcelona alumni
Academic staff of the University of Barcelona
University of Paris alumni
Academic staff of the University of Valencia